Hendrik de Wolf (21 August 1893 – 10 December 1955) was a Dutch weightlifter. He competed in the men's featherweight event at the 1928 Summer Olympics.

References

External links
 

1893 births
1955 deaths
Dutch male weightlifters
Olympic weightlifters of the Netherlands
Weightlifters at the 1928 Summer Olympics
People from Oegstgeest
Sportspeople from South Holland
20th-century Dutch people